Abdominal musculature absent with microphthalmia and joint laxity is a rare human disorder characterized mainly by ligamentous laxity, small eyes, a lack of abdominal muscles and facial anomalies.

References

 Wrong Diagnosis.com
 M. C. Teruel, T. Hernández-Sampelayo, J. Fermosel, M. L. Frias (1987) Multiple malformations: unusual facies, absent, abdominal musculature, microphthalmia, and joint laxity
Musculoskeletal disorders